Western United Football Club, an association football club based in Truganina, Victoria, was founded in 2018 as Western Melbourne.

Connor Pain holds the record for the greatest number of appearances for Western United. Between 2019 and the present day, the Australian forward played 101 times for the club. The club's goalscoring record is held by Besart Berisha, who scored 26 goals in all competitions between 2019 and 2021.

Key
 The list is ordered first by date of debut, and then if necessary in alphabetical order.
 Appearances as a substitute are included.
 Statistics are correct up to and including the match played on 4 March 2023. Where a player left the club permanently after this date, his statistics are updated to his date of leaving.

Players

Players highlighted in bold are still actively playing at Western United.

Captains

References
General
 
 

Specific

Western United
Western United FC
Association football player non-biographical articles